Peter Friis Johansson (born 1983) is a Swedish classical pianist who also holds citizenship of Denmark. He won first prize in the Alaska International Piano-e-Competition in 2014.

References

1983 births
Living people
Swedish classical pianists
Male classical pianists
21st-century classical pianists
21st-century Swedish male musicians